The 2005 Java–Bali Blackout was a power outage across Java and Bali on 18 August 2005, affecting some 100 million people.

Immediate impact
Power went off at around 10:23 am (UTC+7) on 18 August 2005 across most areas of the two islands.

Cause
A transmission line between Cilegon and Saguling, both in West Java, failed at 10:23 am local time; this led to a cascading failure that shut down two units of the Paiton Power Station in East Java and six units of the Suralaya Power Station in West Java

PT. PLN, the state-owned electricity company, confirmed that the electricity grid failed at several points throughout Java and the neighbouring island of Bali, causing a supply shortfall of 2,700 MW, roughly half of the original supply.

Jakarta lost power completely, along with Banten and Special Region of Yogyakarta; there were blackouts in parts of Central Java, along with parts of both West Java and East Java.

Effects
Due to the sudden supply shortfall, power went out in most areas of Java, including all parts of the capital and largest city in Indonesia, Jakarta. Other major cities in Java, such as Surabaya, were also affected.

Restoration of service
Power resumed in most areas of Jakarta at about 5:00 pm (UTC+7) on the same day.

Post-blackout
PLN apologised for the incident and said about 293,235 customers will be compensated. Meanwhile, President Susilo Bambang Yudhoyono ordered police and the national intelligence agency to assist PLN to trace the cause of the blackouts.

See also
List of power outages

References

Power outages in Indonesia
Java-bali Blackout, 2005
Java-bali Blackout, 2005
August 2005 events in Asia
2005 in technology